The Phoenix Pulse Fuel Masters first participated in the Philippine Basketball Association (PBA) draft on October 30, 2016. The Fuel Masters entered the league before the 2016 Commissioner's Cup when they bought the former franchise of Barako Bull Energy.

Matthew Wright became the team's first draft choice, the team's pick in the special draft for the Gilas cadets during the 2016 PBA draft.

Selections

Notes
1.All players entering the draft are Filipinos until proven otherwise.

References

Philippine Basketball Association draft